Garazh (also Romanized as Gārāzh; also known as Gārāzh-e Pol and Gārāzhīl) is a village in Chalanchulan Rural District, Silakhor District, Dorud County, Lorestan Province, Iran. According to the 2006 census, its population was 375, in 98 families.

References 

Towns and villages in Dorud County